Steven John Malone (born 1953) is a former English first-class cricketer. Malone was a right-handed batsman who bowled right-arm fast-medium.

Early career
Malone made his debut in county cricket for Essex in the 1975 season against Cambridge University. Malone next represented Essex in 1978 against Cambridge University, which was to be Malone's final first-class match for Essex.

In the 1980 season Malone made his first-class debut for Hampshire against Kent. Also in the 1980 season, Malone made his List-A debut for Hampshire against Surrey in Group A of the 1980 Benson & Hedges Cup. From 1980 to 1984 Malone represented Hampshire in 46 first-class matches, the last of which came against Gloucestershire in the 1982 County Championship. In his 46 first-class matches for the county, Malone scored 178 runs at a batting average of 6.84, with a high score of 24. In all senses of the matter, Malone was a true tailender. With the ball Malone took 103 wickets at a bowling average of 33.79, with best figures of 7/55 against Oxford University in 1982, which was one of Malone's three five wicket hauls. In additional Malone took ten wickets in a match once.

The same season Malone played his final List-A match for Hampshire against Somerset in the John Player League. In his 65 List-A matches for Hampshire, Malone scored 48 runs at a batting average of 4.80, with a high score of 16. With the ball Malone took 99 wickets at a bowling average of 22.07, with one five wicket haul which gave him best figures of 5/34.

Moving between counties
After leaving Hampshire, Malone joined Glamorgan, making his first-class debut for the Welsh county against Oxford University. The same season during a match against former club Hampshire, Malone took figures of 5/38. Malone played nine first-class matches for Glamorgan in his only season with the county, where he took 13 wickets at a bowling average of 50.30, with best figures of 5/38. In the 1985 season, Malone played just two List-A matches for the county against Lancashire and Northamptonshire.

In 1986 Malone joined Durham, making his only List-A appearance for Durham against Warwickshire in the 1986 NatWest Trophy. In addition Malone represented Durham in three Minor Counties Championship matches in the 1986 season against Bedfordshire, Lincolnshire and Cumberland.

In the 1986 Benson and Hedges Cup, Malone represented the Minor Counties in three List-A matches for them against Warwickshire and playing his final match for a combined Minor Counties side against Leicestershire.

In 1987 Malone joined Dorset, where Malone made a single List-A appearance for the county against former club Hampshire. In additional Malone represented Dorset in two Minor Counties Championship matches against Cheshire and Shropshire.

In 1990 Malone joined Wiltshire, where he played a single List-A match for the county in the 1990 NatWest Trophy against Surrey. This was Malone's final List-A match. In addition to this, Malone represented Wiltshire in 23 Minor Counties Championship matches between 1990 and 1992. Malone's final Minor Counties match for Wiltshire came in 1992 against Herefordshire.

In Malone's overall first-class career he scored 182 runs at a batting average of 5.87, with a high score of 23. With the ball Malone took 118 wickets at a bowling average of 35.89, with three five wicket hauls and taking ten wickets in a match once. Malone's best first-class figures were 7/55. In Malone's overall List-A career he scored 63 runs at a batting average of 4.84 and a high score of 16. With the ball, Malone took 106 wickets at a bowling average of 23.57, with one five wicket haul and best figures of	5/34.

Umpiring career
Malone has stood as an Umpire in two Youth One Day Internationals between England U-19 and Bangladesh U-19 in 2009. Malone has also stood as an umpire in two first-class matches as well as two Minor Counties Championship matches. In 2008, Malone was diagnosed with bowel cancer. Following intensive treatment with chemotherapy, he is in remission.

References

External links
Steve Malone at Cricinfo
Steve Malone at CricketArchive

1953 births
Living people
Sportspeople from Chelmsford
English cricketers
Essex cricketers
Hampshire cricketers
Glamorgan cricketers
Durham cricketers
Minor Counties cricketers
Dorset cricketers
Wiltshire cricketers
English cricket umpires